The 1948 U.S. Open was the 48th U.S. Open, held June 10–12 at Riviera Country Club in Pacific Palisades, California, northwest of Los Angeles. Ben Hogan won the first of his four U.S. Open titles at the course that became known as "Hogan's Alley," as it was his third win at Riviera in less than 18 months. He had won the Los Angeles Open at the course in early 1947 and 1948. It was the third of Hogan's nine major titles; he had won his second PGA Championship a few weeks earlier. He was only the second to win both titles in the same year, joining Gene Sarazen in 1922. Later winners of both were Jack Nicklaus in 1980 and Tiger Woods in 2000.

Although Sam Snead held the lead by a stroke after 36 holes with a record 138, Hogan dominated the final two rounds, shooting 68-69 on Saturday for a total of 276 (−8), two shots ahead of runner-up Jimmy Demaret. Hogan decimated the U.S. Open scoring record (281 by Ralph Guldahl in 1937) by five strokes, and his three rounds in the 60s was a tournament first. The scoring record stood for 19 years, until bested by a stroke by Jack Nicklaus in 1967. Hogan's 8-under-par set a U.S. Open record that stood until 2000, when it was broken by Tiger Woods (12-under, broken by Rory McIlroy in 2011 at 16-under).

Eight months later, Hogan and his wife were involved in a serious automobile accident, a head-on collision with a Greyhound bus in west Texas. The injuries he sustained prevented a defense of his title in 1949 while he recovered. Hogan returned to competition and won the U.S. Open in 1950, 1951, and 1953. (He led after 36 holes in 1952, but finished third.)

Ted Rhodes became the first African-American to play in the U.S. Open since 1913. He opened with 70, made the cut, and finished in 51st place.

This was the first U.S. Open played on the West Coast; the first in the western U.S. was a decade earlier, in 1938 near Denver. The first major played on the West Coast was the PGA Championship in 1929, played at Hillcrest Country Club in Los Angeles.

Babe Didrikson Zaharias became the first woman to attempt to qualify for the U.S. Open, but her application was rejected by the USGA. They stated that the event was intended to be open to men only.

Course layout

Source:

Past champions in the field

Made the cut

Missed the cut 

Source:

Round summaries

First round
Thursday, June 10, 1948

Source:

Second round
Friday, June 11, 1948

Source:

Third round
Saturday, June 12, 1948  (morning)

Source:

Final round
Saturday, June 12, 1948  (afternoon)

Source:

References

External links
USGA Championship Database
USOpen.com – 1948

U.S. Open (golf)
Golf in Los Angeles
U.S. Open
U.S. Open (golf)
U.S. Open golf
U.S. Open (golf)